Jim Barton (born June 29, 1968) is an American politician who served in the Alabama House of Representatives from the 104th district from 2000 to 2013.

References

1968 births
Living people
Republican Party members of the Alabama House of Representatives